George Ferguson  (April 1788 – 15 March 1867) was a Scottish officer of the Royal Navy. He served during the French Revolutionary and Napoleonic Wars, and rose to the rank of admiral. He was also a Tory politician who sat in the House of Commons from 1832 to 1837.

He was the fifth laird of Pitfour in Aberdeenshire from 1821 until his death in 1867.

Family
Ferguson was the illegitimate son of George Ferguson (1748–1820) the fourth Laird of Pitfour, a large estate in the Buchan area of north east Scotland. His father was usually referred to as "the Governor" and Ferguson inherited the sizeable estate, money and also property in Trinidad and Tobago. As he shared the same name as his father, to help differentiate the two, he is generally known as the "Sailor" or the "Admiral", an acknowledgement of his naval career. Ferguson was the fifth laird of Pitfour and held the title from 1821 until 1867. He enjoyed a lavish lifestyle and squandered much of his inheritance gambling. In 1812 he married the heiress Elizabeth Holcombe and received an annuity from her wealthy father, John Woodhouse of Aramstone in Hereford. She died a few weeks after giving birth to their only child, a daughter, in early 1814.

His second marriage was on 7 April 1825. This was to Elizabeth Jane Rowley, the eldest daughter of Clotworthy Rowley, 1st Baron Langford and a niece of the Duke of Wellington. The couple had five children: four daughters – Frances Harriet, Georgina Harriet, Elizabeth Ann and Emily Ann – and a son, George Arthur.

Career
At 17 years of age he was promoted to lieutenant. He continued to rise through the ranks until he left the service in September 1815, at age 27.

In November 1811, Ferguson was commander of the sloop . Ferguson then went to visit his father at Pitfour. However, early the next morning while Ferguson was still ashore, the Pylades broke anchor and was grounded on rocks. Local inhabitants helped throw all the guns overboard and cut away the mast, which successfully re-floated it. The Admiralty refused Ferguson's request for a court-martial to clear his name.

He rose to the rank of rear-admiral in 1849, vice-admiral at the beginning of 1856 and admiral in February 1861 by which time he was 72 years of age.

Electoral reforms were scheduled to be enacted in 1832; Ferguson sought election for the Banffshire constituency in 1831 when only landowners were eligible. The seat was, however, retained by the sitting candidate. At the 1832 general election Ferguson was elected Member of Parliament (MP) for Banffshire. He held the seat until 1837.

According to the Legacies of British Slave-Ownership at the University College London, Ferguson was awarded a payment as a slave trader in the aftermath of the Slavery Abolition Act 1833 with the Slave Compensation Act 1837. The British Government took out a £15 million loan (worth £ in ) with interest from Nathan Mayer Rothschild and Moses Montefiore which was subsequently paid off by the British taxpayers (ending in 2015). Ferguson was associated with "T71/891 Tobago no. 67", he owned 299 slaves in Tobago and received a £5,724 payment at the time (worth £ in ).

Death and legacy
Ferguson died in March 1867 at 37 Charles Street, in Berkeley Square, London, a mansion he had purchased from the Marquess of Bute a number of years earlier despite his financial difficulties. He is buried in a family vault at Kensal Green Cemetery. His second wife and two unmarried daughters are also buried there. His estate passed to his son, George Arthur.

References
Footnotes

Bibliography

External links

Military personnel from Edinburgh
Royal Navy admirals
Royal Navy personnel of the French Revolutionary Wars
Royal Navy personnel of the Napoleonic Wars
Members of the Parliament of the United Kingdom for Scottish constituencies
UK MPs 1832–1835
UK MPs 1835–1837
Tory MPs (pre-1834)
Scottish Tory MPs (pre-1912)
1788 births
1867 deaths
Lairds
Scottish slave owners
Recipients of payments from the Slavery Abolition Act 1833
Burials at Kensal Green Cemetery
19th-century British businesspeople